Focus Brands is an American company that is an affiliate of the American private equity firm Roark Capital Group that currently owns the Schlotzsky's, Carvel, Cinnabon, Moe's Southwest Grill, McAlister's Deli, Auntie Anne's and Jamba brands. It is located in Sandy Springs, Georgia, and operates over 5,000 stores.

History 
Focus Brands began as a holding company for Carvel Corporation after Roark Capital bought controlling interest in the ice cream franchisor from Investcorp in November, 2001.

Roark purchased Cinnabon and the international operations of Seattle's Best Coffee from AFC Enterprises in November 2004, combining the three brands under its Focus Brands affiliate. Focus Brands purchased Schlotzsky's from Bobby Cox Companies in 2006, less than two years after Bobby Cox had purchased the brand from bankruptcy.

On August 11, 2007, Focus Brands announced that it purchased the Moe's Southwest Grill brand from Raving Brands.

In October 2010, Focus Brands acquired the mostly mall-based franchiser Auntie Anne's, a maker of pretzels.

In June 2017, Kat Cole was named Chief Operating Officer.

On August 2, 2018, Focus Brands announced that it would acquire Frisco-based smoothie-maker Jamba, formerly known as Jamba Juice. The acquisition was completed on September 14, 2018.

In February 2020, Jim Holthouser was named Chief Executive Officer.

References

External links
 Company homepage

Companies based in Sandy Springs, Georgia
Restaurant groups in the United States
Restaurants established in 2001
American companies established in 2001
Private equity portfolio companies